Edwin Munjoma (born July 18, 1998) is an American professional soccer player who plays as a defender for Phoenix Rising FC of the USL Championship.

Career

Youth & College 
Munjomoa joined the FC Dallas academy in 2011, before heading to Southern Methodist University to play college soccer. At SMU, Munjoma made 66 appearances, scoring 12 goals and tallying 22 assists. During his time with the Mustangs, Munjoma was East Region First Team Selection by United Soccer Coaches and AAC defensive player of the year. He was also a 2019 MAC Hermann Trophy semifinalist.

Professional 
On January 13, 2020, Munjoma signed with MLS side FC Dallas as a homegrown player, the 27th in the club's history.

He made his professional debut on October 7, 2020, starting for Dallas' USL League One affiliate side North Texas SC in a fixture against Chattanooga Red Wolves. On October 10, 2020, he scored his first career goal in 2-1 victory over Richmond Kickers.

Munjoma was released by Dallas following the 2022 season.

Munjoma was signed by Phoenix Rising FC on January 13, 2023.

Personal life
Born in the Unite States, Munjoma is of Zimbabwean descent.

References

External links 
 Eddie Munjoma | FC Dallas FC Dallas bio
 Eddie Munjoma - Men's Soccer SMU bio

1998 births
All-American men's college soccer players
American soccer players
American people of Zimbabwean descent
Association football defenders
FC Dallas players
Homegrown Players (MLS)
Living people
North Texas SC players
Phoenix Rising FC players
People from McKinney, Texas
SMU Mustangs men's soccer players
Soccer players from Texas
United States men's youth international soccer players
USL League One players
Major League Soccer players
Sportspeople from the Dallas–Fort Worth metroplex